General Findlay may refer to:

James Findlay (Cincinnati mayor) (1770–1835), Ohio Militia major general
Neil Douglas Findlay (1859–1914), British Army brigadier general
Rick Findley (born 1950), Royal Canadian Air Force lieutenant general

See also
Clement Finley (1797–1879), Union Army brigadier general
Jesse J. Finley (1812–1904), Confederate States Army brigadier general